Paswegin is an unorganized area in Saskatchewan, Canada. It is located at kilometre 199 of highway 5, north of the Quill Lakes.

Climate

References

Ghost towns in Saskatchewan
Lakeview No. 337, Saskatchewan
Division No. 10, Saskatchewan